Neuromedin-U receptor 2 is a protein that in humans is encoded by the NMUR2 gene.

Ligands

Agonists
 synephrine

See also
 Neuromedin U receptor

References

Further reading

External links

G protein-coupled receptors